Martin I. Simpson is a British palaeontologist, a geologist best known for his work in the Whitby area. He lives on the Isle of Wight and runs Island Gems at Isle of Wight pearl. Though perhaps best known for his appearances in the British news media, he is also an established expert on Cretaceous fossil crustaceans and has produced important papers on the Cretaceous Lower Greensand Group. His proposal that the five units of the Atherfield Clay Formation be formally recognised as local members  has been widely adopted. He has produced a popular book on fossil hunting, titled Fossil Hunting on Dinosaur Island, and was heavily involved in the excavation of a significant specimen of the ankylosaur Polacanthus.

He has also written about the trade in fossils and on the relationship between academic palaeontologists and amateur dealers and collectors. In the BBC TV series Live from Dinosaur Island (2001), Simpson was associated with the discovery of Isle of Wight amber.

References

Bibliography
  pp. 48.

British palaeontologists
People from the Isle of Wight
Living people
Year of birth missing (living people)